Sirajul Islam Bangladesh Nationalist Party politician and freedom fighter. He was elected a member of parliament in 1991.

Birth and early life 
Sirajul Islam was born in Narayanganj district.

Career 
Sirajul Islam was elected a member of parliament in 1991 from Narayanganj-4.

Death 
Sirajul Islam passed away on 23 March 2012.

References 

2012 deaths
People from Narayanganj District
Bangladesh Nationalist Party politicians
5th Jatiya Sangsad members